On the evening of November 26, 1960, Larry Ralph Peyton (born March 4, 1941) and his girlfriend, Beverly Ann Allan (born May 16, 1941) disappeared after having made plans to shop at the Lloyd Center in Portland, Oregon, United States. The following day, November 27, Peyton's Ford coupe was found in Forest Park, with his mutilated body inside. Allan was missing from the scene, though her purse and coat were still inside the car. A widespread manhunt ensued over the following two months. In January 1961, a highway crew  outside Portland discovered Allan's partially-nude body in a ravine, and it was determined she had been raped and strangled to death.

Their murders went unsolved for seven years until Edward Jorgensen, his brother Carl Jorgensen, and their friend Robert Brom, were all charged with first-degree murder. Edward Jorgensen and Robert Brom were convicted, but Carl Jorgensen was acquitted of his charges.
 Both Edward Jorgensen and Brom appealed their convictions to no success, though Edward was released on parole after serving three years of his sentence, and Brom, after serving seven.

The case received widespread national attention, and has been credited by some journalists as "the most talked-about and written-about double-murder" in the city's history. Some investigators have suggested that Edward Wayne Edwards may have been involved, as he was questioned early in the investigation.

Background
Larry Ralph Peyton was a 19-year-old sophomore at Portland State College; his girlfriend, Beverly Ann Allan, originally from Port Townsend, Washington, was a student at Western Washington University. The two had met in the summer of 1960 while working at Crater Lake National Park, where Peyton's father operated a motor lodge. After spending Thanksgiving with her parents, Allan drove to Portland to visit Peyton and spend the weekend with him. On November 26, 1960, the couple made plans to go shopping at Lloyd Center before departing around 9:00 p.m.

Discovery

Larry Peyton
On the evening of November 27, 1960, Larry Peyton's Ford coupe was discovered parked on a remote lovers' lane in Forest Park in northwest Portland, with his body inside. He had been stabbed a total of 23 times with a  blade, and had also suffered a severe skull fracture. Peyton had mud on his clothing, which suggested he had been outside the car at some point during the attack.

Federal Bureau of Investigation (FBI) officers assisted in the search efforts and collection of evidence at the crime scene. Allan was missing from the scene, though her coat and purse, containing US$11, were left in the car. A pair of crushed women's glasses and a broken women's necklace were also found inside, as well as a portion of a fingernail. A knife was found lying on the hood of the car, and Peyton's penknife was on the ground outside. A single bullet hole was discovered in the car's windshield, but it was determined that the gun had been fired from inside the car. Blood evidence was found both inside and outside the vehicle, but no gun was found at the scene. The keys to the car were located in brush nearby.

Beverly Allan
The search for Allan began after the discovery of Peyton's body. Her father, Robert Allan, offered a $1,000 reward for anyone with information leading to his daughter's whereabouts. Sometime after the discovery of Peyton, a patron of a restaurant in Eugene found a message written in lipstick on the restaurant's bathroom mirror, which read: "I am being held in a brown Ford. Help me." A woman who a witness claimed resembled Allan was purportedly seen at the restaurant with a man, but this claim was ultimately dismissed by police, as the witness, though able to fully describe Allan's features, was unable to describe the man in any detail.

She was lying face-down and was nude from the waist up, wearing only dark grey stockings. One of her shoes, her ski sweater, and a blouse were lying nearby. Her hands were bound with green nylon cord. Near the body was a plastic sheet covered in red stains that appeared to be blood. An autopsy confirmed that Allan's cause of death was strangulation (possibly with rope), and it was estimated she had died between 3:00 a.m. and 7:00 a.m. on November 27. There were signs that Allan had been sexually assaulted prior to her death. Additionally, the partial fingernail found in Peyton's car matched the remaining nail on one of Allan's fingers.

Investigation
Police began questioning the owners of two abandoned cars that were found near the site of Beverly Allan's body; one belonged to U.S. Navy sailor stationed in Astoria, the other to a young man from Banks who claimed the car had become stuck in the mud, resulting in him abandoning it. Police stated at the time of that they believed Peyton and Allan had been ambushed by at least two men. Edward Wayne Edwards, a fugitive who had ties to the Portland area, was considered a suspect, but was cleared when it was concluded he had not been in the area on the date of the murders.

According to the lead investigator, Earl Son, 2,292 individuals were questioned over the course of the investigation. A total of 453 suspects were considered, only 47 of whom were definitively cleared. Approximately $250,000 was spent in search and investigation efforts.

Edward and Carl Jorgensen
In October 1966, Earl Son, one of the lead investigators on the case, received a letter from a woman who claimed to have information regarding the murders. Identified as Nikki Essex, the writer of the letter divulged information that would have only been known to person(s) at the scene of the crime, including a large house party in Forest Park that occurred nearby on the night of the attack, as well as the fact that a knife had been left on the hood of Peyton's car. Mrs. Essex implicated 36-year-old Edward Jorgensen and his brother, Carl Jorgensen (age 27) in the murders of Peyton and Allan. Carl was a former boxer and salesman at an upscale Portland shoe store, while Edward was a married father of five children who operated a garage. According to the letter from Mrs. Essex, both the Jorgensens had attended the house party in Forest Park on the night of the murders.

When detectives questioned Jorgensen's mother at her Portland home, she vehemently denied that her sons had any involvement, and stated: "You're barking up the wrong tree, just because my boys went to a party in the West Hills the night of the murder." In April 1968, Multnomah County Police offered $500 for "more information" leading to the identity of the perpetrators, which was increased to $750 in May.

Indictment and trial
On August 13, 1968, a grand jury was held in the case, which brought an indictment against Carl and Edward Jorgensen, as well as a third man, 28-year-old Robert Gordon Brom. Brom, a resident of Salem, had previously been imprisoned for beating an elderly grocer with a gun in 1962, and was on parole at the time of the murders. Edward Jorgensen was arrested in the middle of the night at his home, while Carl was apprehended at the shoe store where he worked. All three men protested their arrests and pled not guilty to charges of murder.

Trials in the murders began in early November 1968, beginning with the Jorgensens'. Through trial testimony, it was revealed that the Jorgensen brothers and Brom had attended a party on the night of November 26 held by a Mrs. Stephens. During the trials of the three men, Essex provided testimony as the prosecution's star witness. Essex testified that she had left the party at Mrs. Stephen's home on November 26 with Edward Jorgensen and Brom to purchase more beer. En route back to the party, they drove past Peyton and Allan, who were in their vehicle, and invited them to the party. Peyton and Allan agreed, and followed them in the direction of the party. During the drive, the two cars began to race, and Peyton forced Brom's vehicle into a curb, damaging it. Brom returned to the party and obtained another vehicle; Essex, Edward Jorgensen, and now, Carl Jorgensen, went along as passengers. Essex testified that Brom shortly located Peyton's car, and chased it down a dead-end road in Forest Park. The Jorgensens and Brom exited the car and began a confrontation, during which Essex stated she fled on foot to the main road. While at the main road, Essex claimed she heard a "loud crack" that "sounded like a gunshot." Shortly after, Brom and the Jorgensens returned to the main road in Brom's vehicle, and picked up Essex. According to Essex, Allan was in the car with them. Brom dropped Essex off at her home, and he, Edward and Carl Jorgensen, and Allan left. Essex's testimony, however, was questioned by Edward Jorgensen's attorney, Charles Paulson, who pointed out that she had undergone hypnosis and sodium amytal treatments in an attempt to recall the events of the night.

In late November 1968, Edward Jorgensen was convicted of first-degree murder in Allan's death, and second-degree murder in Peyton's. He was sentenced to life imprisonment plus 25 years. 90 witnesses were called during Edward Jorgensen's trial, including his own brother, Carl, who testified that he had no involvement.

Closing arguments in Carl Jorgensen's trial occurred on December 5, 1968 and he was ultimately acquitted of first-degree murder and set free.

In early 1969, Brom was convicted of first-degree murder of Peyton, and sentenced to life imprisonment plus 25 years.

Aftermath

Petitions and parole
In the spring of 1972, both Edward Jorgensen and Brom filed for appeals in their convictions, claiming that Essex was psychologically unstable and had not undergone a competency evaluation before testifying in court. The validity of her testimony was also questioned as she had undergone hypnosis and sodium amytal treatments to regain memory of the events of November 26, 1960. The Oregon Supreme Court, however, ultimately denied a review. On December 23, 1972, Brom was denied a bid for parole.

In 1975, Brom filed for a second appeal, claiming his attorney had failed to adequately represent him. Douglas Tatting, a private investigator who claimed to have worked on the case, testified during the appeal that a witness had told him Beverly Allan was alive on December 28, 1960, over a month after the prosecution claimed she had died. The witness claimed that they had seen Allan at a party held by a local gang on the night of December 28, and that she was being prostituted to partygoers.

Edward Jorgensen was released on parole after serving three years in prison, and in January 1976, both he and Brom filed for relief petitions seeking exoneration in the murder charges. Brom was paroled after serving seven years of his sentence.

Subsequent theories
Journalist Phil Stanford, in 2010, stated that he felt Edward Jorgensen and Brom were paroled so soon for such a high-profile crime because law enforcement did not actually believe in their guilt. Stanford also alleged that the prosecution's star witness, Mrs. Essex, was given sodium amytal treatments and hypnosis while visiting the crime scene, "until she came up with a story that fit their version of what happened." He also claimed that law enforcement were careless with their investigation, losing vaginal swabs from Allan's body, as well as "ruining" the crime scene: "They didn't secure it, and people were walking all over the place, reporters and photographers and cops, leaving footprints and dropping cigarette butts."

Stanford states that Edward Wayne Edwards, a convict who had been a suspect early in the investigation, may have been responsible for the murders, and cites a 1980 double-murder in Wisconsin that is a "virtual carbon-copy" of the Peyton-Allan murders, as evidence. When Edwards was originally questioned in the case, he had a bullet hole in his arm; however, in letter correspondence between Stanford and Edwards, Edwards denied involvement in the Peyton-Allen murders, and claimed he had sustained the bullet injury after his girlfriend shot him during an argument.

References

1960 in Portland, Oregon
1960 murders in the United States
Deaths by stabbing in Oregon
Deaths by strangulation in the United States
November 1960 events in the United States
Murder in Oregon
People murdered in Oregon